The National Engineering School of Sousse or ENISo, is a Tunisian engineering national school based in the city of Sousse located in the east of the country. Part of the University of Sousse.

Establishment
The National Engineering School of Sousse was founded in 2005.

Departments  
The National Engineering School of Sousse has three independent departments: 
 Industrial electronics
 Mechatronics
 Industrial data processing

See also 
 National Engineering School of Tunis
 National Engineering School of Bizerte
 National Engineering School of Monastir
 National Engineering School of Sfax
 National Engineering School of Carthage
 National Engineering School of Gafsa
 National Engineering School of Gabès
 University of Sousse

References

External links 
 Official website

Universities in Tunisia
2005 establishments in Tunisia